The Southern Railway in the United Kingdom was one of the "Big Four" railway companies set up after the 1923 Grouping. This list sets out the constituents of the Company.

Constituent companies
 The London and South Western Railway (LSWR) route mileage 1,020 miles (1,642 km)
 The London, Brighton and South Coast Railway (LBSCR)  miles (736 km)
 The combined systems of the South Eastern Railway and the London, Chatham and Dover Railway, under the South Eastern & Chatham Railways' Managing Committee (SECR)  miles (1026 km). These concerns had formed a working union to operate their services under a Managing Committee on 1 January 1899.

Subsidiary companies

Independently operated lines
 Freshwater, Yarmouth and Newport Railway 12 miles (19 km)
 Isle of Wight Railway  miles (24 km) 
 Isle of Wight Central Railway  miles (46 km)
 Bere Alston and Callington section of the Plymouth, Devonport and South Western Junction Railway  miles (16 km)

Non-working companies
 Originally leased to or worked by LSWR 
 Bridgewater Railway  miles (12 km)
 Lee-on-the-Solent Railway 3 miles (5 km)
 North Cornwall Railway  miles (84 km)
 Plymouth and Dartmoor Railway (portion used by LSWR)  miles (4 km)
 Plymouth, Devonport and South Western Junction Railway (except Bere Alston and Callington section as above)  miles (31 km) 
 Sidmouth Railway  miles (13 km)
Originally leased to or worked by LBSCR
 Brighton and Dyke Railway  miles (8 km)
 Hayling Railway 5 miles (8 km)
Originally leased to or worked by SER or LCDR
 Cranbrook and Paddock Wood Railway 
 Crowhurst, Sidley and Bexhill Railway  
 London and Greenwich Railway  miles (6 km)
 Mid Kent Railway (Bromley to St Mary Cray)  miles (4 km)

Other railways
 Victoria Station and Pimlico Railway (in which the Great Western Railway and the London and North Western Railway were also parties)
 Lynton and Barnstaple Railway:  not covered by the Railways Act 1921, but absorbed by the LSWR. Narrow gauge  miles (31 km)
 Several light railways, including the Basingstoke and Alton Light Railway, though other candidate lines remained independent, such as the Kent and East Sussex Railway

Joint companies
 In 1923, now comprised wholly in the SR:
 Croydon & Oxted Joint Railway  miles (20 km (was LBSCR/SE&CR joint) 
 Dover & Deal Railway  miles (14 km) (was SE&CR)
 Epsom and Leatherhead Railway  miles (6 km) (was LBSCR/LSWR joint)
 Portsmouth and Ryde Joint Railway (including a ferry)   miles (14 km) (was LBSCR/LSWR joint)
 Tooting, Merton and Wimbledon Railway  miles (9 km) (was LBSCR/LSWR joint)
 Woodside & South Croydon Railway  miles (4 km) (was LBSCR/SE&CR joint)
 In 1923, in association with other companies:
 East London Railway 5 miles (8 km) (shared with London and North Eastern Railway (LNER) and Metropolitan Railway)
 Easton & Church Hope Railway  miles (6 km) (joint with Great Western Railway (GWR))
 Somerset and Dorset Joint Railway 105 miles (168 km) (joint with London, Midland and Scottish Railway (LMS))
 West London Extension Railway  miles (8 km) (shared with GWR and LMS)
 Weymouth & Portland Railway  miles (9 km) (joint with GWR)

See also
List of railway companies involved in the 1923 grouping

References
The information in this article taken from the Railway Magazine for February 1923, except as follows:

Big four British railway companies
Pre-grouping British railway companies
Constituent companies of the Southern Railway